Frederick "Fred"/"Freddie" G. Smart (birth unknown – death unknown) was a Welsh professional rugby league footballer who played in the 1930s.

Playing career

International honours
Fred Smart won a cap for Wales while at Wakefield Trinity in the 19-51 defeat by Australia at Wembley Stadium on Saturday 30 December 1933.

County Cup Final appearances
Fred Smart played , i.e. number 5, in Wakefield Trinity's 0-8 defeat by Leeds in the 1932 Yorkshire County Cup Final during the 1932–33 season at Fartown Ground, Huddersfield on Saturday 19 November 1932, played , i.e. number 2, in the 5-5 draw with Leeds in the 1934 Yorkshire County Cup Final during the 1934–35 season at Crown Flatt, Dewsbury on Saturday 27 October 1934, played  in the 2-2 draw with Leeds in the 1934 Yorkshire County Cup Final replay during the 1934–35 season at Fartown Ground, Huddersfield on Wednesday 31 October 1934, played  in the 0-13 defeat by Leeds in the 1934 Yorkshire County Cup Final second replay during the 1934–35 season at Parkside, Hunslet on Wednesday 7 November 1934, and played  in the 2-9 defeat by York in the 1936 Yorkshire County Cup Final during the 1936–37 season at Headingley Rugby Stadium, Leeds on Saturday 17 October 1936.

Club career
Freddie Smart extended Ted Bateson's 'most tries in a season' record for Wakefield Trinity with 29-tries scored in the 1931–32 season, this record would stand for 22-years, when it was extended by Denis John Boocker in the 1953–54 season.

References

External links

Welsh rugby league players
Wales national rugby league team players
Wakefield Trinity players
Rugby league players from Cardiff
Year of birth missing
Place of death missing
Year of death missing
Rugby league wingers